Rocca Grimalda (Ra Roca in dialect) is a village and comune in the province of Alessandria, Piedmont, Northern Italy. It lies in Upper Montferrat, a historical region of Piedmont, and it was built upon a rocky hill on the Orba's left bank, very close to Ovada. The nearest airport is the Cristoforo Colombo Airport in Genoa.

History
The  population who lived here before the Romans, the so-called Ligures, left a number of traces in many places of Orba valley, including   in Rocca Grimalda: the river has always had gold in its sand and during the Roman times, a town was built in the plain under the hill in order to exploit this resource. Old documents report about this centre, called Rondinaria, which was a wealthy little town in the middle of thick forests and had likely some sort of defence structure, probably on Rocca Grimalda's hill, which still dominates the whole plain around and the valley’s entrance.

Right in the plain an old necropolis was found in the 1980s but on the other side of the village’s land another high rocky hill was found to have been shaped as some sort of castle with a deep ditch and high palisades, probably from the Lombard rule era: the same place, called “Trionzo”, was linked with old legends of witches, dances and evil spirits.

The village’s existence was first stated in some documents of 900 and since then Rocca Grimalda changed a number of landlords while conquerors came from the see and from the plains: the  Republic of Genoa, the free town of Alessandria, the duchies of Montferrat and Milan fought for centuries in order to have the control of this strategic stronghold.

From the early 17th to the 18th century, true power in  Rocca Grimalda’s was in the hands of bandit families: they used the thick forests around the village to hide and rob the passers by. Rocca Grimalda got famous for its guns and long knives while no landlord managed to control them, also because they had strong support from people, traditionally against the official rulers coming from other places.  During the 18th century everything changed, the forest was replaced by vineyards, only some little pieces survived as parks of noble mansions.

In 1736 Rocca Grimalda became part of the Kingdom of Sardinia and it shared the history of Piedmont under the Savoia’s crown.

During World War II many young men from the village died in war, many others run to the mountains and fought against the Fascists and the Germans occupying the country: they had to face hard defeats and massacres but they finally managed to set the region free before the arrival of the American and English Armies.

After the War many inhabitants moved to larger cities like Genoa, Milan, Turin and many others in other countries and continents.

From the 1990s the village is living a new renaissance, both in economy and in society, basing its own wealthy on great wines, as “Dolcetto di Ovada” and “Barbera del Monferrato”, tasty food and historical places, which attract tourists from all over the world.

Main sights
Rocca Grimalda has  kept its medieval structure, following the shape of the rocky hill upon which it was built. The names of some parts of the village remind of its old defence role: "Bastioni" (the bastions) "Torricella" (little tower), "Castelvero" (old castle), "Porta" (the gate) and others. The village has still only one gate, right under the Castle.

The Castle was built in the 13th century as a military stronghold, but it was turned into a noble palace five centuries later: it has a medieval part but the rest are alao Renaissance and 19th century-style  rooms.  There is a high circular tower which was used as prisons for long times: its walls have still drawings and signatures by prisoners of the 17th and 18th centuries.

The Parish Church, San Giacomo Maggiore, a building of Romanesque origin in the centre of the village, is decorated with paintings about St. John Bapt's life.  This saint was then replaced by St. James in the villagers' devotion: St. James was a very popular saint in the area because a pilgrimage road to Santiago de Compostela in Spain passed right through these lands.

Two minor churches of the 17th and 18th centuries are dedicated to the Lady and the other to St. James Bapt.: they have very nice and old wooden statues which are carried through the little roads of the village once a year as a sign of popular devotion.

The oldest church in Rocca Grimalda is St. Limbania,  built on the ruins of an old castle, in the lower part of the village: the church is dedicated to Mary's Assumption but it is popularly known as St. Limbania.  Inside there are  frescos of the 15th century but other parts of the building were added later on, when the church turned into some sort of sanctuary for the muleteers who used to carry goods from the sea to the plains and back, through the mountains.  They used to start their journey from a church dedicated to St. Limbania near the sea, in Genoa-Voltri, and they stopped in Rocca Grimalda's church, in order to be sure of St.Limbania's protection through the dangerous journey through the mountains.

Culture
The dance of “Lachera” is performed every year during Carnival time, with features of foundation and propitiatory spring rite.

Lachera is performed in carnival time in its most complete form, with a wedding train through the countryside and 5 day of dances, songs, wine and great food, until it reaches the village and the rite itself is completely performed.  Lachera is often exported in other regions and countries, like Belgium, Austria, France, Germany.

Peirbuieira is a recipe  served every year the last week of August in a festival.

References

External links
  Official website

 Museo della Maschera di Rocca Grimalda

Cities and towns in Piedmont
Municipalities of the Province of Alessandria